Bulbonaricus is a genus of pipefishes native to the Indian and Pacific Oceans.

Species
There are currently three recognized species in this genus:
 Bulbonaricus brauni (C. E. Dawson & G. R. Allen, 1978) (Pugheaded pipefish)
 Bulbonaricus brucei C. E. Dawson, 1984
 Bulbonaricus davaoensis (Herald, 1953) (Davao pughead pipefish)

References

 
Marine fish genera